Mister India 2016 was the eighth edition of Mister India World contest held in Mumbai on 11 December 2016. Sixteen contestants from all over the country were shortlisted to compete in the main event held in Mumbai. Previous year's winner, Mr India 2015 and Mister World 2016, Rohit Khandelwal passed on his title to Vishnu Raj Menon of Kerala. Viren Barman from New Delhi was declared the 1st Runner Up and Altamash Faraz from New Delhi was declared the 2nd Runner Up at the grand finale held in Club Royalty, Mumbai.

Vishnu Raj Menon represented India at the Mister World 2019 contest which held in Manila, Philippines on 27 January 2019.
Altamash Faraz titled as Mr India Supranational 2017 and represented India at Mister Supranational 2017 at Poland where he ended up placing to Top 10 finalists

Results 
Color key

Special Awards

Mr. Style Icon
Altamash Faraz

Contestants
 16 contestants from all over India were shortlisted to compete in the main event in Mumbai.

References

External links
 Mr India Official Website

India
Beauty pageants in India
Mister World